Upper Bohn Lake is a reservoir in Lake County, California, located near Aetna Springs, California.

The reservoir is public and is a fishing spot. A fishing license is required to fish on the reservoir.

References

Reservoirs in Lake County, California
Reservoirs in California
Reservoirs in Northern California